The Staten Island Range Light, also known as the Ambrose Channel Range Light, is the rear range light companion to the West Bank Lighthouse. Built in 1912, the 90-foot tower sits more than five miles northwest of the West Bank Lighthouse, on Staten Island’s Richmond Hill (Lighthouse Hill), 141 feet above sea level.  It shows a fixed white light that can be seen for 18 miles, by all vessels bound to New York and New Jersey Ports coming in from the Atlantic Ocean (on range only).

The original hardware, including the  second magnitude Fresnel lens and glass reflector, remain in place.  However, the original mineral oil-burning lamp has since been replaced  with a 1000 watt General Electric-manufactured Airway Signal incandescent lamp, with the backup light, which automatically turns on in the event of primary lamp failure,  being the same. Many lighthouses have transitioned to LED systems, but this legacy equipment remains in use at this light.

The Staten Island Range Light also has a second light, the Swash Channel Rear Light. This light is also a steady white light beacon, and shines continuously 24 hours a day. The Swash Channel is not a major shipping lane like the Ambrose Channel. Rather, it is akin to a "secondary road," connecting the Ambrose Channel with the Sandy Hook Channel. This secondary light is not within the lantern room, as is the main light, the Rear Ambrose Channel Light.

Both the Ambrose Channel Light, as well as the Swash Channel Light, have backup lights independent from each of the main lighting systems (and the main systems' backup lamps). Neither light blinks or rotates, and each is only visible on range. Additionally, the Staten Island Range Light may be powered by banks of on-site batteries in the event of power failure.

It was designated a New York City Landmark in 1968 and remains a valuable aid to navigation for ships entering the Ambrose Channel in Lower New York Bay.  It was listed on the National Register of Historic Places in 2005.

See also
List of New York City Designated Landmarks in Staten Island
National Register of Historic Places listings in Richmond County, New York

References

External links

 Lighthouse Friends site (photo)
 National Lighthouse Museum (photo)
 USCG list of Fresnel lenses still in operation December 2008
Coast Guard list of Lighthouses
Coast Guard list of assets 
National Park Service's Maritime Heritage Program's Inventory of Historic Light Stations
National Park Service's Maritime Heritage Program's Inventory of NY Historic Light Stations

Lighthouses completed in 1912
Lighthouses on the National Register of Historic Places in New York City
Lighthouses in Staten Island
New York City Designated Landmarks in Staten Island
1912 establishments in New York City
National Register of Historic Places in Staten Island